Fighter is a 2011 Indian Bengali-language action film directed by Rabi Kinagi and starring Jeet and Srabanti Chatterjee. The film was produced by Eskay Movies and IOU Films, the soundtrack was composed by Indradeep Dasgupta.

Plot
The film starts with a flashback. ACP Bose is a sincere police officer happily married and lives with his parents and younger brother Surya. Surya is a college student and he falls in love with his classmate Indu. Enter Section Shankar, Bharat Kaul, the villain who is notorious for settlements and land deals. Indu comes across ACP Bose when she is on a field trip from her college with her friends. She gets friendly with his daughter Pinky who tells her that she will introduce her to her uncle Surya and they would make a good pair. But Surya studies in Indu's college and soon after they accidentally even come to know each other and get close.

ACP Bose investigates the case of a dreaded criminal Section Shankar whom no one has been able to touch. He is even involved with a land deal involving crores of money which is completely illegal and others including the D.I.G. is involved. When the chairman of the bank who has lent money for the deal demand the money back as the deal hasn't worked, but Section Shankar eliminates him. The people who are customers of the bank take to the streets and try to damage the bank. ACP Bose arrives there, arrests the manager and takes him away. Somehow Section Shankar discovers where the manager has been taken. He arrives there with his men and the D.I.G. and nearly kill ACP Bose. Section Shankar asks his men to dump the body. On the way, somehow Surya gets involved and ultimately rescues his brother from a burning bus and the elder brother dies in the younger brother's arms. The entire media and the people think that ACP Bose has swindled off all the money as they have been made to believe that by the D.I.G. Surya decides to take revenge on the people who killed his brother. Firstly he kills Nikhil (his friend and Section Shankar's friend) . Then he kills the D.I.G. (he had been taken to jail and he had escaped). Nikhil had also kidnapped Indu as he wants her at any cost, but Surya rescues her. Section Shankar also kidnaps the entire family of Surya. Surya goes to Section Shankar house's where he kills Shankar and rescues his family under the supervision of the new D.I.G. who supports him wholeheartedly.

Cast
 Jeet as Surya
 Srabanti as Indu
 Ferdous Ahmed as A.C.P Subhash Bose (killed)
 Locket Chatterjee as A.C.P Bose's wife
 Biplab Chatterjee as a corrupt D.I.G.
 Ashish Vidyarthi as D.I.G. (cameo)
 Biswajit Chakraborty as Surya and A.C.P Bose's father
 Joy Badlani as Indu's father
 Bharat Kaul as Section Shankar (killed)
 Sumit Ganguly
 Mousumi Saha as Indu's mother
 Biswanath Basu as Ice-Cream Boy
 Gargi Banerjee as Newsreader
 Arindam Saha as Train Passenger

Soundtrack
The album is composed by Indradeep Dasgupta for Fighter.

References

External links
Review
 
 Fighter at the Gomolo

2011 films
Bengali-language Indian films
2010s Bengali-language films
Films scored by Indradeep Dasgupta
Bengali remakes of Telugu films
Indian action films
2011 masala films
2011 action films